The Sharpsville Area School District is a small, suburban/rural, public school district serving parts of Mercer County, Pennsylvania. The district is one of the 500 public school districts of Pennsylvania. The district's attendance area encompasses the communities of Sharpsville, Clark, and Pymatuning Township. According to 2010 federal census data, it serves a resident population of 7,408. In 2009, the Sharpsville Area School District residents’ per capita income was $19,471, while the median family income was $44,213. In the Commonwealth, the median family income was $49,501 and the United States median family income was $49,445, in 2010.

Sharpsville Area School District operates Sharpsville Area Elementary School, Sharpsville Area Middle School, and Sharpsville Area Senior High School. The middle and high schools are connected- and as a direct result, many staff members and several rooms are shared between the two.

Extracurriculars
Sharpsville Area School District offers a wide variety of clubs, activities and an extensive sports program.

Sports
The district funds:

Boys
Baseball - AA
Basketball - AA
Cross Country - A
Football - A
Golf - AA
Soccer - AA
Track and Field - AA
Wrestling	- AA

Girls
Basketball - AA
Cross Country - A
Soccer (Fall) - A
Softball - A
Track and Field - AA
Volleyball

Middle School Sports

Boys
Basketball
Cross Country
Football
Soccer
Track and Field
Wrestling	

Girls
Basketball
Cross Country
Soccer
Track and Field
Volleyball

According to PIAA directory July 2013

References

School districts in Mercer County, Pennsylvania